The 2006 United States House of Representatives election in Alaska was held on Tuesday, November 7, 2006. The term of the state's sole Representative to the United States House of Representatives expired on January 3, 2007. The winning candidate would serve a two-year term from January 3, 2007, to January 3, 2009. The primary elections were held on August 22, 2006.

Combined primary

Candidates
Diane E. Benson (D), 2002 Green Party nominee for Governor
Ray Metcalfe (D), former Alaska State Representative
Eva L. Ince (G)
Alexander Crawford (L)
Todd Hyde (D)
Frank Vondersaar (D), perennial candidate
Sol L. Gerstenfeld (L)

Results

Republican primary

Candidates
Don Young, incumbent U.S. Representative

Results

General election

Results

References

Alaska

2006
House, U.S.